Cantiere Navale di Visentini is a family owned Italian shipbuilder, based in Donada near Venice. The company is largest private shipbuilder in Italy.

Deliveries

Ferries

Generation 1 / Other

Generation 2

Generation 3

Generation 4

Generation 4+

Generation 5

Generation 6

Generation 7

References

 
Shipbuilding companies of Italy
Shipyards of Italy
Defence companies of Italy
Italian brands
Companies based in Veneto